The Cercetae are an ancient people of Scythia mentioned by Strabo and Pliny the Elder. They are one of many ancient tribes of the Northwestern Caucasus which are the ancestors of modern Circassians. The name "Cercetae" apparently was the basis of the name of the people that arose later - the Circassians.

Pliny places them beyond the Amazons and the Hyperboreans, together with the Cimmerii,  Cissianti, Achaei, Georgili, Moschi, Phoristae and Rimphaces.

See also
Zygii
Circassians
Maeotians

References

 

Scythia
Ancient peoples
Ancient peoples of Russia
Ancient Circassian tribes